San Giovanni Bono Church is a reinforced concrete Brutalist church in Quartiere Sant'Ambrogio Milan, Italy dedicated to John the Good. The building was designed by Arrigo Arrighetti and completed in 1968.

References 

Buildings and structures in Milan
Brutalist architecture in Italy
Churches completed in 1968